The Saemangeum Seawall, located on the southwest coast of the Korean peninsula, is the world's longest man-made dyke, measuring . It runs between two headlands, and separates the Yellow Sea and the former Saemangeum estuary.

Since then, the government has spent nearly 2 trillion won ( billion USD) on construction of the dyke, with another 220 billion won ( million USD) budgeted on strengthening the dyke and a further 1.31 trillion won ( billion USD) to transform the tidal flats into arable land and the reservoir.

The construction of the Saemangeum Seawall has caused controversy from the moment it was announced as environmental groups protested against the impact of the dyke on the local environment.  Supreme Court challenges in 1999 and 2005 led to temporary production stoppages but ultimately failed to stop the project. Major construction was completed in April 2006, with the seawall  longer than the Afsluitdijk in the IJsselmeer, the Netherlands, previously the longest seawall-dyke in the world.

With remaining minor construction and inspection finished, the seawall was officially open to the public on 27 April 2010. Then South Korean president Lee Myung Bak commented that Saemangeum would be "the kernel and the gateway of South Korea's west coast industrial belt", and is "another effort by us for low-carbon and green growth, along with the four-rivers project". A ceremony was held in Saemangeum the same day, with cabinet officials, politicians, and delegates from other countries.

A floating solar PV plant of 2.1 GW capacity is planned using the coastal reservoir area of the Saemangeum Seawall.

Composition 

The road on Saemangeum Seawall with the length of 33 km, connects Buan County to Gunsan is a part of National Route 77.

IS: Intersection, IC: Interchange

See also
Saemangeum
Sihwa Lake Tidal Power Station
Environment of South Korea
The Four Major Rivers Restoration Project
Kalpasar Project

References

 "Saemangum seawall completed", The Korea Herald, 22 April 2006, Seoul.
 Google Earth view
 Google Maps view
Article in New York Review of Books  Mentions Saemangeum Seawall as prime example of bird habitat loss

Seawalls
Buildings and structures in South Korea

Nature conservation in South Korea
Buildings and structures in North Jeolla Province
Environmental disasters in Asia
2006 in South Korea
2006 in the environment
Internal territorial disputes of South Korea
Saemangeum